The yellow-billed cuckoo (Coccyzus americanus) is a cuckoo. Common folk-names for this bird in the southern United States are rain crow and storm crow. These likely refer to the bird's habit of calling on hot days, often presaging rain or thunderstorms. The genus name is from Ancient Greek , which means to call like a common cuckoo, and americana means "of America".

Taxonomy
The yellow-billed cuckoo was formally described by the Swedish naturalist Carl Linnaeus in 1758 in the tenth edition of his Systema Naturae. He placed it with all the other cuckoos in the genus Cuculus and coined the binomial name Cuculus americanus. Linnaeus based his description on the "Cuckow of Carolina" that had been described and illustrated in 1729-1732 by the English naturalist Mark Catesby in his The Natural History of Carolina, Florida and the Bahama Islands. The yellow-billed cuckoo is now placed with 12 other species in the genus Coccyzus that was introduced in 1816 by the French ornithologist Louis Jean Pierre Vieillot. The genus name is from the Ancient Greek kokkuzō meaning "to cry cuckoo". The species is monotypic: no subspecies are recognised.

Description

Adults have a long tail, brown above and black-and-white below, and a black curved bill with yellow especially on the lower mandible. The head and upper parts are brown and the underparts are white. There is a yellow ring around the eye. It shows cinnamon on the wings in flight. Juveniles are similar, but the black on the undertail is replaced by gray.

Measurements:

 Length: 10.2-11.8 in (26-30 cm)
 Weight: 1.9-2.3 oz (55-65 g)
 Wingspan: 15.0-16.9 in (38-43 cm)

Distribution and habitat
Their breeding habitat is deciduous woods from southern Canada to Mexico  and the Caribbean. They migrate to Central America, and as far south as northern Argentina. This bird is a rare vagrant to western Europe.

Behavior and ecology

Food and feeding
These birds forage in dense shrubs and trees, also may catch insects in flight. They mainly eat insects, especially tent caterpillars and cicadas, but also some lizards, eggs of other birds and berries. Cuckoos sometimes congregate near insect outbreaks or emergences, including outbreaks of exotic gypsy moth caterpillars.

Breeding
They nest in a tree or shrub, usually up to 2–12 feet (1–4 meters) above the ground. The nest is a flimsy platform of short twigs placed on a horizontal branch. The 3-4 eggs are incubated for 14 days or less. The chicks are able to climb about with agility at 7–9 days of age. At about this same time, the feathers of the chicks burst out of their sheaths and the young are able to fly. The entire time from egg-laying to fledging may be as little as 17 days. Yellow-billed cuckoos occasionally lay eggs in the nests of other birds (most often the closely related black-billed cuckoo), but they are not obligate brood parasites of other birds as is the common cuckoo of Eurasia.

Conservation status
There is an ongoing debate regarding the taxonomic status of the western race and if it is distinct from those birds in the east. This question is significant to the conservation status of this species in the west, where it has declined to a tiny fraction of its population a century ago. Populations of this species in western North America are in steep decline. The bird disappeared from British Columbia, Washington, and Oregon during the first half of the twentieth century. Eastern populations have declined as well, though not as precipitously. The United States Fish and Wildlife Service listed the western Distinct Population Segment (DPS) of Yellow-billed Cuckoos as threatened under the Endangered Species Act on 11/3/2014, and the service also has established 546,335 acres in nine western states as critical habitat for the western DPS of the yellow-billed cuckoo. Controversy over the taxonomic status and heavy pressure from livestock and mining industries caused the Trump administration to attempt to end the species' protections, and the FWS reviewed the bird's listing. In September 2020, the USFWS determined that the western DPS of yellow-billed cuckoo is distinct, and the listing as Threatened is warranted.

References

Further reading 
 John K. Terres (1980), Audubon Society Encyclopedia of North American Birds, Knopf, 
 David Gaines Review of the Status of the Yellow-Billed Cuckoo in California: Sacramento Valley Populations The Condor, Vol. 76, No. 2 (Summer, 1974), pp. 204–209
 Laymon, S.A., and M.D. Halterman. 1987. Can the western subspecies of Yellow-billed Cuckoo be saved from extinction? Western Birds 18:19-25.

External links 

 Natchez Naturalist
 Center for Biological Diversity
 Cornell University--All About Birds
eNature.com profile
 USGS
 PRBO Western Race
 Yellow-Billed Cuckoo Bird Sound

yellow-billed cuckoo
Native birds of Eastern Canada
Birds of the United States
Birds of the Caribbean
Birds of Hispaniola
Birds of the Dominican Republic
Birds of Haiti
Birds of South America
yellow-billed cuckoo
yellow-billed cuckoo
Extant Late Pleistocene first appearances